Sammy Ndjock (born 25 February 1990) is a Cameroonian professional footballer who currently plays for Atlantis in the third tier of Finnish Kakkonen.

Club career
Born in Yaoundé, Ndjock graduated from Lille's youth categories, and made his senior debuts with the club's B-side in the 2006–07 campaign, in Championnat de France amateur. He joined Turkish Süper Lig side Antalyaspor in August 2010, and made his professional debut late in the month, starting in a 0–0 home draw against Trabzonspor. He played 7 games in his debut season, and repeated the same amount in his second.in his third, he made 15 games.

In August 2013, Ndjock moved to Fethiyespor, freshly promoted to TFF First League, in a season-long loan deal. He was an undisputed starter during the campaign, also playing the full 90 minutes in a 2-1 Turkish Cup success against country giants Fenerbahçe.

Ndjock signed with Minnesota United on 9 March 2015.

During a friendly match on 21 July 2016 against AFC Bournemouth, Ndjock tried to quickly throw the ball to a teammate, but accidentally let the ball slip and fall into his own goal instead. This was the second goal in the game that Bournemouth eventually won 4–0. A similar incident occurred with Bjarte Flem in 1988.

Ndjock joined Mikkelin Palloilijat for the first time in January 2018 and played for the club until the summer, before he left and moved back to Cameroon. But that didn't go as expected, so he moved back to Finland and signed for the same club again. The deal was announced 24 November 2018.

Ndjock and MP mutually cancelled the contract in 2020 and he signed with RoPS playing in Veikkausliiga.

International career
Ndjock made his international debut with Cameroon on 2 June 2013, starting and playing the full 90 minutes in a 0–0 draw against Ukraine. He was selected to Volker Finke's 28-man provisional squad for 2014 FIFA World Cup, and also appeared in the final list for the tournament.

References

External links

TFF profile 

1990 births
Living people
Footballers from Yaoundé
Cameroonian footballers
Cameroonian expatriate footballers
Lille OSC players
Antalyaspor footballers
Fethiyespor footballers
Minnesota United FC (2010–2016) players
Süper Lig players
Mikkelin Palloilijat players
Kakkonen players
North American Soccer League players
Expatriate footballers in France
Expatriate footballers in Turkey
Expatriate soccer players in the United States
Cameroon international footballers
TFF First League players
2014 FIFA World Cup players
Association football goalkeepers